Lesche is an ancient Greek word meaning council or conversation.

Lesche or Lesches may also refer to:

People
Lesches (7th century), early Greek poet
Verné Lesche (1917–2002), Finnish speed skater

Places
Lesches, Seine-et-Marne, French commune
Lesches-en-Diois, French village and commune
Lesche of the Knidians, a former meeting room within the sanctuary of Apollo, Delphi, Greece

See also
Leschea ( 1990s), R&B performer